Joshua Felix Pacio (born January 10, 1996) is a Filipino mixed martial artist who competes in the Strawweight division of ONE Championship. He is the former ONE Strawweight World Champion. From April 2016 to July 2016, he was ranked at the #8 Strawweight in the world according to Fight Matrix. As of December 1, 2022, Pacio is the #23 Flyweight in the world, as ranked by Fight Matrix. He is currently ranked #1 in the ONE Championship Strawweight rankings.

Early life and education
Joshua Pacio grew up in La Trinidad, Benguet and he had to learn to be independent at such an early age after his father worked overseas to provide for his family. Pacio got exposed to martial arts at the early age of 11, where he started working on his kickboxing, before transitioning to Wushu at age 13. Pacio took up Hotel and Restaurant Management at the University of the Cordilleras in Baguio

Mixed martial arts career

Early mixed martial arts career

Pacio made his debut at Team Lakay Championship 8, where he came away with a first round TKO over Denver Songaben. This would be a start off red-hot six-match winning streak which eventually led to him being signed by ONE Championship.

He made his ONE Championship debut on April 15, 2016 - beating compatriot Rabin Catalan by second-round technical knockout at ONE Championship: Global Rivals at the Mall of Asia Arena in the Philippines.
 
After beating Kritsada Kongsrichai, Pacio earned his first shot at the ONE Strawweight World Championship against Yoshitaka Naito at ONE Championship: State of Warriors on October 17, 2016 in Yangon.

Pacio came close to being a World Champion at age 20, as he punished Naito with his patented Wushu strikes on the feet, but a mishap in the third round cost him the entire match as he got submitted by the Japanese via rear naked choke.

First World Title reign

After his loss to Naito, Pacio would wreak havoc in the division - winning five of his next six bouts to book another date with Naito this time at ONE: Conquest of Heroes on September 23, 2018 in Jakarta Indonesia.

Pacio rematched Yoshitaka Naito at ONE Championship: Conquest of Heroes on September 22, 2018. Pacio looked more confident in the rematch as he stuffed Naito's takedowns for much of the first two rounds while punishing him on the striking department with lightning quick kicks and combinations from different angles. The Japanese did finish strong as he scored takedowns on his younger opponent, but Pacio stayed busy even on his back - earning all of the judges' nod to get a unanimous decision victory.

Losing the belt, Second reign

Pacio's reign, however, would not last long as he dropped his belt four months later to Yosuke Saruta at ONE Championship: Eternal Glory on January 19, 2019, in a controversial split-decision.

The Japanese pushed the action while Pacio opted to pick his spots and counter in one of his more tactical bouts yet. In the end, two of the judges favored Saruta's aggression - crowning him the new ONE Strawweight World Champion.

With a close finish, Pacio was given an outright rematch at ONE Championship: Roots of Honor in Manila on April 12, 2019  Pacio did not disappoint as he scored a sensational fourth round knockout win with a well-timed knee to regain his lost title.

Later that night, ONE Chairman and CEO Chatri Sityodtong announced that there would be no need for an immediate trilogy after Pacio's definitive win.

Pacio defended his belt for the first time in his second reign as he takes on compatriot Rene Catalan at ONE Championship: Masters of Fate in Manila on November 8, 2019. He defeated Catalan via arm-triangle choke in the second round.

Pacio defended his title again against Alex Silva at ONE Championship: Fire and Fury on January 31, 2020. He won the very close bout via split decision.

Pacio defended his ONE Strawweight World Championship in a trilogy match against Yosuke Saruta at ONE Championship: Revolution on September 24, 2021. He won the bout via TKO in the first round.

Pacio was expected to make his fourth title defense against the #1 ranked strawweight contender Jarred Brooks at ONE 158 on June 3, 2022. The bout was eventually postponed, as Brooks withdrew from the fight due to an injury. The fight was rescheduled at ONE 164 on December 3, 2022. Pacio lost the fight and the belt by unanimous decision, making him and the Philippines had no more Filipino World Champions of any weight classes.

Pacio left his gym on March 10, 2023 together with other three fellow former Team Lakay athletes.

Titles and accomplishments
ONE Championship 
ONE Strawweight World Champion (two times; former)
Three successful title defences

Mixed martial arts record

|-
|Loss
|align=center|20–4
|Jarred Brooks
|Decision (unanimous)
|ONE 164: Pacio vs. Brooks
|
|align=center|5
|align=center|5:00
|Pasay, Philippines
|
|-
|Win
|align=center|20–3
|Yosuke Saruta
|TKO (punches) 
|ONE: Revolution
|
|align=center|1	
|align=center|3:38 
|Kallang, Singapore
|
|-
|Win
|align=center|19–3
|Alex Silva
|Decision (split)
|ONE: Fire and Fury
|
|align=center|5
|align=center|5:00
|Pasay, Philippines
|
|-
|Win
|align=center|18–3
|Rene Catalan
|Submission (arm-triangle choke)
|ONE: Masters of Fate
|
|align=center|2
|align=center|2:29
|Pasay, Philippines
|
|-
|Win
|align=center|17–3
|Yosuke Saruta
| KO (head kick)
|ONE: Roots of Honor
|
|align=center| 4
|align=center| 2:42
|Pasay, Philippines
|
|-
|Loss
|align=center|16–3
|Yosuke Saruta
|Decision (split)
|ONE: Eternal Glory
|
|align=center|5
|align=center|5:00
|Jakarta, Indonesia
|
|-
|Win
|align=center|16–2
|Yoshitaka Naito 
|Decision (unanimous)
|ONE: Conquest of Heroes
|
|align=center|5
|align=center|5:00
|Jakarta, Indonesia
|
|-
|Win
|align=center|15–2
|Pongsiri Mitsatit 
|Submission (hammerlock)
|ONE: Reign of Kings
|
|align=center|1
|align=center|3:37
|Pasay, Philippines
|
|-
|Win
|align=center|14–2
|Ming Qiang Liang 
|Submission (rear naked choke)
|ONE: Global Superheroes
|
|align=center|1
|align=center|4:01
|Pasay, Philippines
|
|-
|Win
|align=center|13–2
|Roy Doliguez
|KO (spinning back fist)
|ONE: Legends of the World
|
|align=center|2
|align=center|0:38
|Pasay, Philippines
|
|-
|Loss
|align=center|12–2
|Hayato Suzuki
|Submission (rear naked choke)
|ONE: Kings and Conquerors
|
|align=center|1
|align=center|3:17
|Macau, SAR, China
|
|-
|Win
|align=center|12–1
|Dejdamrong Sor Amnuaysirichoke 
|Decision (split)
|ONE: Warrior Kingdom
|
|align=center|3
|align=center|5:00
|Bangkok, Thailand
|
|-
|Loss
|align=center|11–1
|Yoshitaka Naito 
|Submission (rear-naked choke)
|ONE: State of Warriors
|
|align=center|3
|align=center|1:33
|Yangon, Myanmar
|
|-
|Win
|align=center|11–0
|Kritsada Kongsrichai 
|Submission (rear-naked choke) 
|ONE: Heroes of the World
|
|align=center|1
|align=center|4:37
|Macau, SAR, China
|
|-
|Win
|align=center|10–0
|Rabin Catalan
|TKO (punches) 
|ONE: Global Rivals
|
|align=center|2
|align=center|3:19
|Pasay, Philippines
|
|-
|Win
|align=center|9–0
|Roy Menzi Jr.
|Submission (guillotine choke)
|Team Lakay Championship 10 
|
|align=center|3
|align=center|2:05
|La Trinidad, Benguet, Philippines
|
|-
|Win
|align=center|8–0
|Janito Bayot
|Submission (guillotine choke)
|Team Lakay Championship 10 
|
|align=center|1
|align=center|2:02
|La Trinidad, Benguet, Philippines
|
|-
|Win
|align=center|7–0
|Joco Mabute 
|Submission (armbar)
|PXC Laban: Baguio 4 
|
|align=center|0
|align=center|0:00
|Baguio, Philippines
|
|-
|Win
|align=center|6–0
|Ric Myler Empil
|TKO (doctor stoppage)
|PXC Laban: Baguio 3
|
|align=center|1
|align=center|3:23
|Baguio, Philippines
|
|-
|Win
|align=center|5–0
|Mark Joseph Abrillo
|Submission (rear-naked choke) 
|Spartacus MMA 
|
|align=center|2
|align=center|1:39
|Manila, Philippines
|
|-
|Win
|align=center|4–0
|Jordan Lobida
|KO (punch)
|Fullcon Fighting Championship 2
|
|align=center|1
|align=center|3:41
|Baguio, Philippines
|
|-
|Win
|align=center|3–0
|Jonel Borbon
|TKO (Ground & Pound)
|PXC Laban: Baguio 2
|
|align=center|1
|align=center|0:00
|Baguio, Philippines
|
|-
|Win
|align=center|2–0
|Ignacio Galindez
|Submission (verbal) 
|Team Lakay Championship 9 
|
|align=center|1
|align=center|0:00
|La Trinidad, Benguet, Philippines
|
|-
|Win
|align=center|1–0
|Denver Songaben 
|TKO
|Team Lakay Championship 8 
|
|align=center|1
|align=center|0:00
|Baguio, Philippines
|
|-

References

External links
 Joshua Pacio at ONE

1996 births
Living people
Filipino male mixed martial artists
Filipino sanshou practitioners
Filipino Muay Thai practitioners
Mixed martial artists utilizing sanshou
Mixed martial artists utilizing Muay Thai
University of the Cordilleras alumni
Sportspeople from Benguet
ONE Championship champions